Nicolas de Staël (January 5, 1914 – March 16, 1955) was a French painter of Russian origin known for his use of a thick impasto and his highly abstract landscape painting. He also worked with collage, illustration and textiles.

Early life
Nicolas de Staël was born Nikolai Vladimirovich Stael von Holstein in Saint Petersburg, into the family of a Russian Lieutenant General, Baron Vladimir Stael von Holstein, (a member of the Staël von Holstein family, and the last Commandant of the Peter and Paul Fortress) and his second wife, Lubov Vladimirovna Berednikova (his first wife was Olga Sakhanskaya). De Staël's family was forced to emigrate to Poland in 1919 because of the Russian Revolution; both his father and stepmother died in Poland and the orphaned Nicolas de Staël was sent with his older sister Marina to Brussels to live with a Russian family (1922).

Career beginnings
He eventually studied decoration and design at the Brussels Académie Royale des Beaux-Arts and architecture at the Académie de St Gilles (1932). In the 1930s, he traveled throughout Europe, lived in Paris (1934) and in Morocco (1936) (where he first met his companion Jeannine Guillou, also a painter and who would appear in some of his paintings from 1941–1942) and Algeria. In 1936 he had his first exhibition of Byzantine-style icons and watercolors at the Galerie Dietrich et Cie, Brussels. He joined the French Foreign Legion in 1939 and was demobilized in 1941. Sometime in 1940 he met one of his future dealers, Jeanne Bucher.

During the War
In 1941, he moved to Nice where he met Jean Arp, Sonia Delaunay and Robert Delaunay, and these artists would inspire his first abstract paintings, or "Compositions".
In 1942, Jeannine and Nicolas de Staël's daughter Anne was born. The growing family also included Jeannine's nine-year-old son Antoine. In 1943 (during the Nazi occupation), de Staël returned to Paris with Jeannine, but the war years were extremely difficult. During the war his paintings were included in several group exhibitions and in 1944 he had his first one-man exhibition at the Galerie l'Esquisse. In April 1945, he had a one-man exhibition at the Galerie Jeanne Bucher and in May 1945 his paintings were included in the first Salon de Mai. De Staël's work was also included in the Salon d'Automne that year. In Paris in 1944, he met and befriended Georges Braque, and by 1945 his exhibitions brought him critical fame. However times were difficult, and successes came too late, since Jeannine died in February 1946 from illness brought on by malnutrition.

Professional success
De Staël met Françoise Chapouton in the spring of 1946, and they married in May. In October 1946 thanks to his friendship with artist André Lanskoy (whom he met in 1944) de Staël made a contract with Louis Carré who agreed to buy all the paintings that he produced. By January 1947 the de Staël family moved into larger quarters thanks to increased recognition and increased sales. In 1947 he befriended his neighbor American private art dealer Theodore Schempp. De Staël's new studio in Paris was close to Georges Braque's and the two painters became good friends. In April 1947 his second daughter Laurence was born. In April 1948 his son Jerome was born, also that same year in Paris he began a long friendship with German artist Johnny Friedlaender.  His paintings began to attract attention worldwide. In 1950 he had a one-man exhibition at the Galerie Jacques Dubourg in Paris and Schempp introduced de Staël's paintings to New York, with a private exhibition at his Upper East Side apartment. He sold several paintings to important collectors including Duncan Phillips of the Phillips Collection. He had considerable success in the United States, and England in the early 1950s. In 1950 Leo Castelli organized a group exhibition at the Sidney Janis Gallery in New York City that included him. In 1952, he had one-man exhibitions in London, Montevideo, and in Paris.
In March 1953, he had his first official one-man exhibition at M. Knoedler & Co. in New York City. The show was both a commercial and critical success. In 1953 he had an exhibition at the Phillips Gallery in Washington DC, (known today as The Phillips Collection in Washington DC) and they acquired two more of his canvasses. Visiting the United States in 1953 de Staël and Francoise visited MoMA, the Barnes Foundation in Merion, Pennsylvania and various other important institutions.

After returning to Paris, de Staël met visiting New York art dealer Paul Rosenberg who offered de Staël an exclusive contract.  De Staël signed with Paul Rosenberg partially because Rosenberg was French and because he was an important New York art dealer who showed many Cubist painters whom Nicolas de Staël admired. By the end of 1953 the demand for de Staël's paintings was so great that Paul Rosenberg raised his prices and continually requested more paintings. The demand was so high for his planned spring 1954 exhibition, that Rosenberg requested an additional fifteen paintings. Once again this exhibition was both commercially and critically successful. In April 1954 de Staël's fourth child Gustave was born. In that spring he had a successful exhibition in Paris at Jacques Dubourg's gallery. His new paintings marked his departure from abstraction and a return to figuration, still-life and landscape.

In the fall of 1954, he moved with his family to Antibes.

Death

By 1953, de Staël's state led him to seek isolation in the south of France (eventually in Antibes). He suffered from exhaustion, insomnia and depression. In the wake of a disappointing meeting with disparaging art critic Douglas Cooper, on March 16, 1955 he committed suicide. He leapt to his death from his eleventh story studio terrace, in Antibes. He was 41 years old.

Nicolas de Staël is buried at the Montrouge Cemetery.

Legacy
De Staël's painting career spans roughly 15 years (from 1940) and produced more than a thousand paintings.  His work shows the influence of Gustave Courbet, Paul Cézanne, Henri Matisse, Pablo Picasso (especially Picasso in his Blue and Rose periods), Georges Braque, Fernand Léger and Chaïm Soutine, as well as of the Dutch masters Rembrandt, Vermeer and Hercules Seghers.  During the 1940s and beginning in representation (especially landscapes, but also still lifes, and portraits), de Staël moved further and further toward abstraction. Evolving his own highly distinctive and abstract style, which bears comparison with the near-contemporary American Abstract Expressionist movement, and French Tachisme, but which he developed independently of them. Typically his paintings contained block-like slabs of colour, emerging as if struggling against one another across the surface of the image.
Accordingly, when a Rothko painting was paired with one by Nicolas de Staël in the show of young French and American painters, Rothko commented to William Seitz (in 1952): "Blobs vs. blocks. They both begin with ‘b.‘ Comparisons are false!"". 
In fact, according to de Staël himself, he turned to his "abstracting" because he "found it awkward to paint an object as a likeness because of the awkwardness I felt when faced[!] with the infinite multitude of coexisting objects in any single object".

De Staël's work was quickly recognized within the post-war art world, and he became one of the most influential artists of the 1950s. However, he moved away from abstraction in his later paintings, seeking a more "French" lyrical style, returning to representation (seascapes, footballers, jazz musicians, seagulls) at the end of his life. His return to imagery during the early 1950s can be seen as an influential precedent for the American Bay Area Figurative Movement, as many of those abstract painters made a similar move; returning to imagery during the mid-1950s. His painting style is characterized by a thick impasto showing traces of the brush and the palette knife, and by a division of the canvas into numerous zones of color (especially blues, reds and whites).  His most well-known late paintings of beaches and landscapes are dominated by the sky and effects of light.

Much of de Staël's late work—in particular his thinned and diluted oil on canvas abstract landscapes of the mid-1950s—predicts Color field painting and Lyrical Abstraction of the 1960s and 1970s. Nicolas de Staël's bold and intensely vivid color in his last paintings predict the direction of much of contemporary painting that came after him including Pop Art of the 1960s.

The French New Wave filmmaker Jean-Luc Godard has stated that de Staël is his favorite painter, and the use of primary colors in his film Pierrot Le Fou was strongly influenced by de Staël's work.

See also
School of Paris
Tachisme
Lyrical Abstraction

References

Sources 
 Exhibition Catalogue, Nicolas de Staël, paintings 1950–1955, Mitchell-Innes & Nash, NYC. 1997, .
 Douglas Cooper, Nicolas de Staël, Masters and Movements,  Weidenfeld and Nicolson Ltd. London, 1961.
 Lefevre Fine Art, Thomas Gibson Fine Art, "Works on Paper"  Nicolas de Staël, "Sans Titre", page 60

External links 
Pompidou Center show, in French
artcyclopedia entry
Nicolas de Staël, in French museums
Nicolas de Staël biography on Applicat-Prazan

Nicolas de Stael: In Memoriam

Art Informel and Tachisme painters
1914 births
1955 suicides
Abstract painters
School of Paris
20th-century French painters
20th-century French male artists
French male painters
White Russian emigrants to Poland
Polish emigrants to France
Painters who committed suicide
Painters from Brussels
Modern painters
Landscape artists
French still life painters
Baltic-German people
Suicides in France
Soldiers of the French Foreign Legion
Suicides by jumping in France
French abstract artists